(North Frisian: di Ströön) is a peninsula and former island in North Frisia on the North Sea coast of Germany. It is part of the Nordfriesland district in the federal state of Schleswig-Holstein. Its area is 50 km² and its population is 2,300. Nordstrand has two municipalities, Nordstrand and smaller Elisabeth-Sophien-Koog, which are part of the Amt Nordsee-Treene.

In medieval times Nordstrand was a part of the larger island of Strand, which was torn into pieces in a disastrous storm tide in 1634. More than 6,000 people drowned. Other remnants of Strand are Pellworm and some Halligen islets.

Nordstrand is accessible by road over a causeway, which connects to the mainland and was built in 1936. In 1987 the polder Beltringharder Koog was completed, turning the former island into a peninsula.

Local alcoholic beverage
Nordstrand is the origin of a locally famous alcoholic beverage, the Pharisäer (Pharisee), which the islanders developed in 1872 to be able to drink alcohol in the presence of local pastor Georg Bleyer, who preached abstinence. It is made from hot strong coffee, sugar, dark rum (4 cl of 54% vol.) and whipped cream (to prevent the alcohol from evaporating, so that it could not be smelled). The pastor got the only cup without rum, but one day the cups got mixed up. When he discovered the deceit he exclaimed "Ihr Pharisäer!" ("You Pharisees!", connoting: "hypocrites"). Hence the name.

North American emigrants who used it as a surname
The original Nordstrand island (before the flood of 1634) is thought to be the ancestral homeland of the North American surname ‘van Nostrand’ (including variants: vanNostrand, vanNordstrandt, vanOstrand).  Two brothers emigrated from here to what is now New York, USA, in 1637 and 1638 after the flood.
One of the three granite panels of the Canadian van Nostrand monument, in York Mill's Cemetery, Toronto (St John’s, York Mills, Anglican Church, 19 Don Ridge Dr., North York, Toronto, Ontario), points to Nordstrand Island.

Pieter Karstense van Nortstrant was born about 1605 on the island of Norstrand. Coupled with the name of his father, Carsten or Kersten, and the fact that his children were baptized in the Lutheran Church in Amsterdam, it would seem that a German, Frisian or Danish origin is probable. It is uncertain when Pieter Karstense came to Amsterdam, possibly as a child with his father, though no record of the latter has been found there. The sons of Pieter Pietersen Ostrander (son of Pieter Karstense van Nortstrant) were called Van Norstrande or Van Nostrande, whilst Van Ostrande was used in other baptisms and eventually became the surname Oostrander and then the spelling as it is today, Ostrander.

Famous peoples 
 Ludwig Ingwer Nommensen, was a German Lutheran missionary to Batak Lands, North Sumatra in the Dutch East Indies (today in Indonesia), who also translated the New Testament into the native Batak language and the first Ephorus (bishop) of Batak Christian Protestant Church.
 Peter Harry Carstensen, prime minister of the state of Schleswig-Holstein from 2005 until 2012.

See also
Jan Adriaanszoon Leeghwater, Dutch hydraulic engineer

References

External links

Integrated Landscape and Cultural Heritage Management and Development Plan for the Wadden Sea Region

Polders
Peninsulas of Schleswig-Holstein
Former islands of Germany
North Frisian Islands
Nordfriesland